is a Japanese professional wrestler currently working for Dramatic Dream Team (DDT). Oishi started his career in Kaientai Dojo, where he became a Strongest-K Tag Team, Independent World Junior Heavyweight and UWA World Middleweight Champion, at one time holding all three titles simultaneously. In 2010, Oishi left Kaientai Dojo to become a freelancer, before making DDT his new home promotion in September 2011.

Personal life 
Oishi became engaged to fellow professional wrestler Misaki Ohata on May 27, 2018. He married Ohata in January 2019. Their first child was born on 1 December 2019.

Championships and accomplishments 
 Dramatic Dream Team
DDT Extreme Championship (1 time)
 Ironman Heavymetalweight Championship ( 19 times)
KO-D 6-Man Tag Team Championship (3 times) – with Danshoku Dino and Kensuke Sasaki (1), Aja Kong and Danshoku Dino (1), and Mao and Shunma Katsumata (1)
 KO-D 10-Man Tag Team Championship (1 time) – with Ken Ohka, Ladybeard, LiLiCo and Super Sasadango Machine
 KO-D Tag Team Championship (1 time) – with Kudo
 World Ōmori Championship (1 time)
 MAGP Award (February 3, 2013)
 Ice Ribbon
 International Ribbon Tag Team Championship (1 time) – with Choun Shiryu
 Go! Go! Golden Mixed Tag Tournament (2011) – with Neko Nitta
 Kaientai Dojo
 Strongest-K Tag Team Championship (3 times, current) – with Shiori Asahi
 UWA World Middleweight Championship (4 times)
 Independent World Junior Heavyweight Championship  (1 time)
 WEW Hardcore Tag Team Championship (2 times) – with Shiori Asahi
 Best Tag Team Match (2009) with Shiori Asahi vs. Gentaro and Yoshiya on August 9
 Best Tag Team Match (2011) with Shiori Asahi vs. Prince Devitt and Ryusuke Taguchi on April 17
 Michinoku Pro Wrestling
 Tohoku Tag Team Championship (1 time) – with Shiori Asahi

References

External links 
Profile at Dramatic Dream Team official website
Profile at Kaientai Dojo official website

Japanese male professional wrestlers
Living people
1979 births
Sportspeople from Shizuoka Prefecture
21st-century professional wrestlers
Tohoku Tag Team Champions
DDT Extreme Champions
Independent World Junior Heavyweight Champions
Ironman Heavymetalweight Champions
KO-D 6-Man Tag Team Champions
KO-D 8-Man/10-Man Tag Team Champions
KO-D Tag Team Champions
WEW Hardcore Tag Team Champions
Strongest-K Tag Team Champions
UWA World Middleweight Champions